Olivia Isabel Rodrigo (born February 20, 2003) is an American singer-songwriter and actress. She gained recognition in the late 2010s with her lead roles on the Disney television programs Bizaardvark and High School Musical: The Musical: The Series. After signing with Geffen and Interscope Records in 2020, Rodrigo released her debut single "Drivers License", which broke various records and became one of the best-selling songs of 2021, propelling her to mainstream fame. She followed it up with singles "Deja Vu" and "Good 4 U", and released her debut solo studio album, Sour (2021), which was met with critical and commercial success, winning various accolades including three Grammy Awards. A Disney+ documentary, Olivia Rodrigo: Driving Home 2 U, chronicling her creative process with Sour, followed in 2022.

Rodrigo has achieved two Billboard Hot 100 number-one singles, one Billboard 200 number-one album, and five multi-Platinum certifications by the Recording Industry Association of America (RIAA). In addition to other recognitions, she has won an American Music Award, seven Billboard Music Awards and four MTV Video Music Awards. Time named her the 2021 Entertainer of the Year and Billboard named her Woman of the Year in 2022.

Life and career

2003–2019: Early life and acting 
Olivia Isabel Rodrigo was born on February 20, 2003, at Rancho Springs Medical Center in Murrieta, California, to school teacher Jennifer and family therapist Chris Rodrigo. She lived and grew up in neighboring Temecula. Rodrigo is Filipino American; her father is Filipino while her mother has German and Irish ancestry. She has stated that her paternal great-grandfather moved from the Philippines to the United States as a teenager and her family follows Filipino traditions and cuisine. Rodrigo started taking vocal lessons in kindergarten and learned to play piano soon after. She began taking acting and singing classes at age six and started acting in theater productions in elementary school. Rodrigo was playing guitar by age 12. She grew up listening to her parents' favorite alternative rock music, such as the bands No Doubt, Pearl Jam, the White Stripes, and Green Day. Rodrigo became interested in songwriting after listening to country music, especially American singer-songwriter Taylor Swift. She moved to Los Angeles after landing her role on Bizaardvark.

Rodrigo first appeared onscreen in an Old Navy commercial. Shortly after in 2015, at age twelve, she made her acting debut portraying the lead role of Grace Thomas in direct-to-video film An American Girl: Grace Stirs Up Success. In 2016, Rodrigo received recognition for starring as Paige Olvera, a guitarist in the Disney Channel series Bizaardvark, a role she played for three seasons. 

In February 2019, she was cast in the starring role of Nini Salazar-Roberts on the Disney+ series High School Musical: The Musical: The Series, which premiered in November of that year. Rodrigo was praised for her performance, with Joel Keller from Decider describing her as "especially magnetic". In 2022, she left the show at the end of its third season to focus on her music career.

2020–present: Music breakthrough and Sour 
 
Rodrigo signed with Interscope Records and Geffen Records in 2020. She negotiated the record deal to secure for herself ownership of the masters of her music. On January 8, 2021, she released her debut single, "Drivers License", which she co-wrote with producer Dan Nigro. Within the week of its release, "Drivers License" was critically acclaimed, and broke Spotify's record twice for most daily streams ever for a non-holiday song with over 15.7 million global streams on January 11 and over 17 million global streams the next day. It went on to break another Spotify record for the first song in history to hit 80 million streams in 7 days. The song debuted at number one on Billboard Hot 100, and reached number-one in numerous other countries. Rodrigo stated in an interview that "It's been the absolute craziest week of my life ... My entire life just, like, shifted in an instant."

On April 1, 2021, Rodrigo released her follow-up single, "Deja Vu", which debuted at number eight on the Billboard Hot 100, making her the first artist to debut their first two releases in the top 10 of the Hot 100. The third single preceding her debut album, "Good 4 U", followed on May 14, 2021, and became her second single to debut at number one on the Hot 100. Sour, her debut studio album, was released on May 21, 2021, to critical acclaim. Charlie Gunn of The Forty-Five called it "the greatest coming-of-age album since early Taylor Swift or Lorde". Slate Chris Molanphy said its first three singles alone established Rodrigo's "early status as Gen-Z's most versatile new artist". According to Clash critic Robin Murray, Rodrigo is regarded as one of Generation Z's finest artists, while Variety dubbed her "the Voice of her Generation" in its cover story of Rodrigo. Sour debuted at number one on the Billboard 200 chart and spent a total of five weeks at the spot, becoming the longest reigning number-one album by a female artist in 2021.

In June 2021, Rodrigo premiered Sour Prom, a prom-themed concert film on YouTube. On December 6, 2021, Rodrigo announced a world tour, including tour stops in the United States, Canada, and Europe. Three days later, she was named Entertainer of the Year by Time. In an Instagram post on December 24, 2021, Rodrigo uploaded a snippet of a Christmas song called "The Bels" that she wrote and recorded at age five. According to Billboard, Rodrigo closed 2021 as the best-selling singles artist worldwide, placing eight songs on the year-end Global 200 chart, including "Drivers License" at number four, "Good 4 U" at number nine,  and "Deja Vu" at number 27. In the US and UK, Sour was respectively the third and fourth best-selling album of 2021. Sour and "Drivers License" were also respectively Spotify's most streamed album and song globally. The International Federation of the Phonographic Industry (IFPI) ranked Rodrigo as the tenth best selling artist of 2021 and Sour as the second best selling album of 2021.

On February 17, 2022, Rodrigo announced and released the trailer of her Disney+ documentary film Olivia Rodrigo: Driving Home 2 U, which was released on March 25, 2022. Rodrigo received seven nominations at the 64th Annual Grammy Awards, including Best New Artist, Album of the Year for Sour, and Record of the Year and Song of the Year for "Drivers License". She won the awards for Best New Artist, Best Pop Vocal Album for Sour, and Best Pop Solo Performance for "Drivers License".

Artistry

Influences

Rodrigo cites Taylor Swift and Lorde as her idols and main musical inspirations, and also dubbed herself Swift's biggest fan "in the whole world". She dubs The White Stripes band member Jack White her "hero of all heroes". Her other influences include Alanis Morissette, Kacey Musgraves, Fiona Apple, St. Vincent, Cardi B, Gwen Stefani and Avril Lavigne.

Songwriting and voice
Rodrigo's voice type is identified as soprano. Media outlets generally describe Rodrigo as a pop artist, musically rendering to pop rock, teen pop, and indie pop styles. Rodrigo has stated that she wants to be a songwriter and not "the biggest pop star that ever lived", and chose to sign with Interscope/Geffen Records because its CEO praised her songwriting, not her "potential star quality". Music journalist Laura Snapes called Rodrigo a "flag-bearer" for a new wave of songwriters who incline towards power ballads "that are as emotional as ever, but project that emotion inward, trading bombast for hush", and described her musical style as rooted in heartache, mental health, and sadness, without being melodramatic, expressing more realistic perspectives than resilient.

Other activities

Rodrigo became consumer beauty brand Glossier's first ever celebrity partner in April 2022.

On July 13, 2021, Rodrigo was involved in a White House effort to promote COVID-19 vaccinations among young people in the U.S. She met with President Joe Biden, Vice President Kamala Harris and Chief Medical Advisor Anthony Fauci, to discuss her efforts. CNN reported that Rodrigo would record videos about the importance of young people getting vaccinated, including answering questions the youth have regarding the vaccination.

Philanthropy and activism 
Rodrigo and Madison Hu teamed up with Instagram #KindComments to encourage their fans to spread kindness and foster positivity on social media in October 2017-2018.

On April 10, 2018, Rodrigo with Madison Hu joined other artists for My Friend's Place 30th Anniversary, a non-profit organization that helps homeless youth find shelter, food, work, education and healthcare. The event was hosted by Jack Black and was able to raise over $740,000 for local homeless youth.
In the same year, Rodrigo became the face of 'She Can STEM' campaign. She was named an institute speaker and panelist for the Geena Davis Institute on Gender in Media in 2018.

In February 2021, Rodrigo released her merchandise "Spicy Pisces T-shirts" on her website and all the proceeds went to Plus1 benefitting She's The First which sponsors young girls scholarship and education. In June 2021, she sold her clothes, wardrobe and all items from her music videos on Depop and 100% of all proceeds from 'Sour Shop' was donated to charitable organization. Rodrigo donated a portion of her Sour Tour platinum ticket sales to Women for Women International which support women survivor of war by helping them rebuild their lives after war devastation. In December 2021, she joined Katy Perry, Kelly Clarkson, Billy Porter and more on Musicians on Call in the 2nd Annual Virtual Concert "Hope for the Holidays" to bring Christmas cheer by uplifting performances and messages of hope to hospital patients via virtual concert.

In response to the 2022 overruling of the Roe v. Wade U.S. Supreme Court ruling, Rodrigo performed "Fuck You" with British singer Lily Allen at Glastonbury Festival. She prefaced the performance by dedicating it to the associate justices who voted to overturn Roe, Samuel Alito, Clarence Thomas, Neil Gorsuch, Amy Coney Barrett, Brett Kavanaugh, saying "I'm devastated and terrified. So many women and so many girls are going to die because of this. I wanted to dedicate this next song to the five members of the Supreme Court who have showed us that at the end of the day, they truly don't give a shit about freedom. The song is for the justices."

On November 20, 2022, Rodrigo joined Billie Eilish, John Legend, Tom Holland and more  with co-founders Eddie Vedder and Jill Vedder for the Third Annual Venture Fundraising event and helped raise more than $1.3 million last November and $6 million for the last 3 years to find a cure for Epidermolysis Bullosa and other rare disease. In December 2022, Rodrigo with Chris Stapleton, Selena Gomez and more donated exclusive items to 2nd Annual ASCAP Foundation which support music education and talent development programs across the U.S. In the same month, Rodrigo took part on Annual Virtual Concert 'Musicians on Call' with 30 different artists  which brought holiday classic performances and videos of messages of hope to patients, families and health-workers in more than 5,000 hospitals nationwide. 

In January 2023, Rodrigo with Harry Styles, Taylor Swift, BTS J-Hope donated items to MusiCares Foundation Charity Relief Auction to help struggling musicians with their medical bills and other financial needs.

Filmography

Discography

Sour (2021)

Tours

Sour Tour (2022)

Achievements 

For her work in music, Rodrigo has various accolades, including three Grammy Awards, seven Billboard Music Awards, four MTV Video Music Awards, four iHeartRadio Music Awards and two People's Choice Awards, an American Music Award, a Brit Award and a Juno Award.

Rodrigo was placed on the 2021 edition of Time magazine's 100 Next list, and was named Times Entertainer of the Year for 2021. Billboard also honored her with their Woman of the Year at the 2022 Billboard Women in Music event. She has also received "Songwriter of the Year" honors by Variety in 2021, and at the 2022 ASCAP Awards.

See also
 List of artists who reached number one in the United States

Footnotes

References

External links 

 
 

 
2003 births
21st-century American actresses
21st-century American women singers
21st-century American singers
Actresses from California
American actresses of Filipino descent
American child actresses
American child singers
American musicians of Filipino descent
American people of German descent
American people of Irish descent
American television actresses
Geffen Records artists
Interscope Records artists
Living people
People from Murrieta, California
People from Temecula, California
Singers from California
Brit Award winners
Grammy Award winners
Juno Award for International Album of the Year winners
American alternative rock musicians
American pop rock musicians
Child pop musicians
American indie pop musicians
American women pop singers
American women singer-songwriters
Folk-pop singers